Gymnastics events have been staged at the Olympic Games since 1896. Brazilian female artistic gymnasts have participated in every Summer Olympics since 1980, except for 1996, when Soraya Carvalho qualified but had to withdraw before the start of the competition due to an ankle injury. A total of 17 female gymnasts have represented Brazil. At the 2020 Tokyo Olympic Games, Rebeca Andrade won gold in the vault and silver in the individual all-around.

Gymnasts

Summer Olympics

Youth Olympic Games

Decorated gymnasts

Summer Olympics

Youth Olympic Games

Gallery

See also 
 Brazil women's national gymnastics team

References

Gymnastics in Brazil

Brazil
gymnasts
Olympic